Selçuk Yula (November 8, 1959 – August 6, 2013) was a Turkish football player and topscorer.

Professional career
Yula started his career in the Ankara club Şekerspor. His transfer to Fenerbahçe at the age of 19, had been a milestone in his career, where he became twice league topscorer with 16 goals in 1982, with 19 goals in 1983, and he won two league titles with Fenerbahçe, where he scored a total of 134 goals. He also played and scored in the match against Bordeaux, European Champions of the time, that Fenerbahçe won 3–2.

Yula played for Blau-Weiß 90 Berlin in German Bundesliga in the season 1986–1987. He then came back to Turkey to play for Sarıyer (1987–1991) and then Galatasaray (1991–1993). He quit his professional career under Fenerbahçe jersey, in a specially scheduled match played between Fenerbahçe vs. Erzurumspor in Şükrü Saracoğlu Stadium.

International
He was capped 22 times for the Turkish national football team, including three times as the team-captain.

Other Interests
One of the most remarkable football legends of Fenerbahçe, Yula was a sports journalist with the newspaper Fotomaç and also served as sports critic and expert for the Fenerbahçe TV and ATV with weekly appearances. He was selected as the "Best Sports Critic of the Year" among the polls made within the Fenerbahçe fans in 2005 and 2007.

Death
On August 6, 2013, Yula died at the age of 53 of a heart attack.

References

External links
TFF Profile

1959 births
2013 deaths
Footballers from Ankara
Turkish footballers
Turkey international footballers
Turkey youth international footballers
Fenerbahçe S.K. footballers
Blau-Weiß 1890 Berlin players
Galatasaray S.K. footballers
Sarıyer S.K. footballers
Süper Lig players
Bundesliga players
Turkish expatriate footballers
Turkish expatriate sportspeople in Germany
Association football forwards